Andreas Kleinheinz (born 28 April 1983) is a German ice hockey player currently playing for ATSE Graz of the Austrian Oberliga.

Kleinheinz began his hockey career with ESV Kaufbeuren in the German Oberliga. After two seasons they were promoted to the 2nd Bundesliga. In 2003 he moved back to the Oberliga, joining EV Füssen for one season. He then went back to the 2nd Bundesliga with EV Füssen and then returned to Kaufbeuren. In 2007, he moved to Austria to join Graz 99ers.

External links

1983 births
ATSE Graz players
German ice hockey forwards
Graz 99ers players
Living people
Place of birth missing (living people)